Glenda McKay (born 2 February 1971) is a British actress.

She is best known for playing the character of Rachel Hughes on the popular ITV soap Emmerdale from 1988 until the character was killed off in 1999, in a well-remembered scene in which she was pushed of a cliff by Graham Clark.

Glenda's brother Craig McKay also starred alongside her in Emmerdale as her screen brother Mark Hughes (who was killed off in the air crash episode that was aired on 31 December 1993). McKay has since become a teacher in West Yorkshire, and following her marriage, is known as Glenda Cumberland.

External links
 

1971 births
Living people
English soap opera actresses
People from Guiseley
Actresses from Leeds